Uncharacterized protein C12orf43 is a protein that in humans is encoded by the C12orf43 gene.

References

External links

Further reading